Cercospora nicotianae is a fungal plant pathogen.

References

External links

nicotianae
Fungal plant pathogens and diseases